Anqasi (Quechua for cobalt salt used for dyeing, hispanicized spelling  Angasi) is a mountain in the Andes of Peru, about  high. It is situated in the Ayacucho Region, Lucanas Province, Cabana District. It lies north of a mountain named Inka Wasi.

References 

Mountains of Peru
Mountains of Ayacucho Region